The 2004 British Formula Ford Championship is the 29th edition of the British Formula Ford Championship. The first race started on 4 April at Donington Park and the last race on 3 October at Brands Hatch after 10 rounds and 20 races. The series switched from supporting the British Touring Car Championship to supporting the British GT and British Formula Three Championship. After 2004 the series continued to support the two series until the end of 2012.

Drivers and teams

Race calendar and results

Drivers' Championship

External links
 The home of the British Formula Ford Championship 

British Formula Ford Championship seasons
Formula Ford